Lieutenant General Herman Georg Waldemar Wrangel (30 March 1859 – 13 January 1938) was a senior officer in the Swedish Coastal Artillery. He served as commanding officer of the Swedish Coastal Artillery for 15 years (1909–1924). Wrangel served as secretary, member and chairman of a number of committees and commissions. Wrangel was also a member of the Upper House of the Riksdag and a member of the Committee on Defence as well as of the Committee of Supply.

Early life
Wrangel was born on 30 March 1859 in Klara Parish, Stockholm, Sweden, the third son of the then lieutenant, later colonel Erik Fredrik Wrangel (1816–1896) and his wife Katarina Maria Gustafva Ehrenstam, a daughter of minister Johan Fredrik Ehrenstam and his wife (née af Trolle). Through this mother, Herman Wrangel had naval ancestry: before his appointment as head of the Ministry for Naval Affairs, his grandfather was a colonel and executive officer of the navy's construction corps (Flottans konstruktionskår). His grandmother was the granddaughter of admiral Henrik af Trolle, together with Chapman in his time the innovator of the Swedish Navy. On his father's side he belonged to the branch of the old extensive Wrangel family, which in a younger lineage culminated in the field marshal, equally famous for his warlike exploits on land and at sea, Count Carl Gustaf Wrangel.

Wrangel was the brother of Carl Wrangel (1855–1913), Lieutenant General Johan Gustaf Fabian Wrangel (1858–1923) and professor Ewert Wrangel (1863–1940). He became a student at the Royal Swedish Naval Academy in 1873 and a sea cadet in 1877 and a cadet non-commissioned officer in 1878. Wrangel graduated in 1879 and was appointed acting sub-lieutenant (underlöjtnant) in the Swedish Navy the same year. Wrangel then attended the Royal Central Gymnastics Institute from 1882 to 1884.

Career

Military career
Wrangel was promoted to sub-lieutenant (löjtnant) in 1883 and two years later he was called up for service in the General Staff and continued partly there, partly in the Fleet Staff until 1889, when at the same time as his appointment as captain he was commanded to serve as an adjutant in the Military Office of the Ministry for Naval Affairs, which position he held until 1891. In the spring of 1889 he was also posted as a substitute teacher on board cadet ships and maintained this position for three summers in a row and then for seven years he maintained the position as a regular teacher in navigation at the Royal Swedish Naval Academy. In 1893 he also became a teacher in naval warfare after the then lieutenant Wilhelm Dyrssen, and retained this post until 1901. In 1895 he had also been appointed teacher of naval science at the Royal Swedish Army Staff College, in 1898 as teacher of strategy at the Royal Swedish Naval Academy and in 1900 as teacher of tactics at the same educational institution. During his work as a teacher at the Royal Swedish Naval Academy, Wrangel invented and designed a new solution to the problems of astronomical navigation (location determination through two altitude observations), which were then still widely used by Swedish navigators. Wrangel was promoted to lieutenant commander and was posted as head of the Communications Department in the Fleet Staff from 1900 to 1901. After finishing his teaching career at the Royal Swedish Army Staff College in 1903, he also resigned from his remaining teaching positions in the spring of 1906. Wrangel served as flag captain of the staff of the Chief of the Coastal Fleet from 1904 to 1907. He was promoted to captain in 1907 and to major general in 1909 and appointed commander of the Swedish Coastal Artillery. He was promoted to lieutenant general in 1916 and went on a study trip to the Western Front in 1918. He left active service in 1924 and entered the reserve from which he left in 1932.

Wrangel was secretary, member and chairman of a number of committees and commissions, including secretary of the Naval Materiel Committees (Sjökrigsmaterielkommittéerna) in 1892 and member in 1901, member of the Defence Committee (Försvarskommittén) from 1909 to 1910, chairman of the Navigation School Committee (Navigationsskolekommittén) from 1910 to 1911 and for experts concerning the organization of the permanent coastal defence in 1913 as well as in the Coastal Fortification Commission (Kustbefästningskommissionen) from 1914 to 1918. He was an executive board member of the Swedish Shipping and Navy League (Föreningen Sveriges flotta) from 1906 to 1930, and became its chairman in 1924 and its honorary chairman in 1934. From 1913 to 1930 he was chairman of the board of the Swedish Aeronautical Society. Wrangel was also chairman of the board of Stockholms Nya Spårvägs AB from 1905 to 1915.

Political career
Wrangel was a member of the Upper House of the Riksdag (where he belonged the National Party) from 1909 to 1910 for Blekinge County and from 1914 to 1919 for Gothenburg and Bohus County and including a member of the Committee on Defence in 1914, of the select committee no 2 in 1915, no 1 in 1917 and in 1918 as well as of the Committee of Supply (Statsutskottet) in 1918 and in 1919. Within the Riksdag, Wrangel worked for the strengthening of the defence (especially the navy) and for the increase of construction activities, and towards the end of his term as Member of the Riksdag strongly emphasized the need for frugality with state funds. In this a respect at the Riksdag of 1919, he alone opposed within the Committee of Supply against the index number raised by the committee for the calculation of the cost-of-living bonus. Wrangel's opinion was also followed by the Upper House, but in the joint vote the committee's proposal was approved. Wrangel was also a diligent writer, especially in the naval field, in addition to a number of magazine and newspaper essays as well as articles in Nordisk familjebok as well as several brochures published, among others Sjövind, tankar i försvarsfrågan (1886), Lärobok i teoretisk och praktisk navigation (1897; 2nd edition in 1910; translated to Spanish), Svenska flottans bok (1898) as well as the work based on extensive research Kriget i Östersjön 1719–1721 (2 volumes, 1906–1907), and for two years he conducted research for the part of the General Staff's work Sveriges krig åren 1808–09 ("Sweden's war in the years 1808–09"), which includes the war at sea.

Personal life
Wrangel married on 19 December 1883 in Karlskrona City Parish (Karlskrona stads församling) to Gertrud Hallberg (25 May 1862 in Karlskrona – 17 March 1914 in Skeppsholms Parish, Stockholm), the daughter of the vicar August Ferdinand Hallberg and Marie Charlotte Crona. Wrangel married on 7 March 1922 in Stockholm (Västerhaninge Parish, Stockholm County) with Gertrud Erika Matilda Sterky (11 May 1884 – 4 March 1923 in Solna Parish), the daughter of Carl Gustaf Sterky and Hedvig Augusta Norström.

He was the father of naval commander Erik Valdemar Hermansson (1884–1927), Maria Lizinka Hermansdotter (born 4 July 1887 in Karlskrona) and Gertrud ("Greta") Margareta Hermansdotter (born 11 June 1890 in Skeppsholms Parish, Stockholm).

Wrangel was the owner of Villa Ekebo in Harlösa, Malmöhus County.

Death
Wrangel died on 13 January 1938 in Harlösa Parish, Malmöhus County.

Dates of rank

Fleet
1879-10-17 – Acting sub-lieutenant
1883-04-27 – Sub-lieutenant
1889-10-25 – Lieutenant
1900-12-31 – Lieutenant commander
1903-12-31 – Commander
1907-10-11 – Captain

Coastal Artillery
1909-08-13 – Major general
1916-08-16 – Lieutenant general

Awards and decorations
   Commander Grand Cross of the Order of the Sword (6 June 1917)
   Commander 1st Class of the Order of the Sword (6 June 1911)
   Knight of the Order of the Sword (1 December 1899)
   Knight of the Order of the Polar Star (18 September 1897)
   Illis quorum (1931)
  (King Gustaf V Olympic Commemorative Medal (Konung Gustaf V:s olympiska minnesmedalj, GV:sOlM) (1912)

Foreign
   Knight 2nd Class with Star of the Order of Saint Stanislaus (28 June 1909)
   Knight 2nd Class of the Order of the Red Eagle (1908)
   Knight of the Order of Franz Joseph (1903)
   Officer of the Order of Aviz (26 May 1898)
   Knight of the Legion of Honour (July 1908)
   Knight of the 3rd Class of the Order of the Crown (18 September 1897)

Honours
Member of the Royal Swedish Academy of War Sciences (1st class 1899; 2nd class 1909)
Member of the Royal Swedish Society of Naval Sciences (1890)
Honorary member of the Royal Swedish Society of Naval Sciences (1909)
Member of the Royal Society for Publication of Manuscripts on Scandinavian History (Kungliga Samfundet för utgivande av handskrifter rörande Skandinaviens historia'') (1907)

Selected bibliography

References

1859 births
1938 deaths
Swedish Coastal Artillery lieutenant generals
Military personnel from Stockholm
Commanders Grand Cross of the Order of the Sword
Knights of the Order of the Polar Star
Officers of the Order of Aviz
Knights of the Order of Franz Joseph
Chevaliers of the Légion d'honneur
Members of the Royal Swedish Society of Naval Sciences
Members of the Royal Swedish Academy of War Sciences
Members of the Första kammaren
Recipients of the Illis quorum
Herman